Graphitizing and non-graphitizing carbons (alternatively graphitizable and non-graphitizable carbon) are the two categories of carbon produced by pyrolysis of organic materials. Rosalind Franklin first identified them in a 1951 paper in Proceedings of the Royal Society. In this paper, she defined graphitizing carbons as those that can transform into crystalline graphite by being heated to 3000°C, while non-graphitizing carbons don't transform into graphite at any temperature. Precursors that produce graphitizing carbon include polyvinyl chloride (PVC) and petroleum coke. Polyvinylidene chloride (PVDC) and sucrose produce non-graphitizing carbon. Physical properties of the two classes of carbons are quite different. Graphitizing carbons are soft and non-porous, while non-graphitizing carbons are hard, low density materials. Non-graphitizing carbons are otherwise known as chars, hard carbons or, more colloquially, charcoal. Glassy carbon is also an example of non-graphitizing carbon.

The precursors for graphitizing carbons pass through a fluid stage during pyrolysis (carbonization). This fluidity facilitates the molecular mobility of the aromatic molecules, resulting in intermolecular dehydrogenative polymerization reactions to create aromatic, lamellar (disc-like) molecules. These “associate” to create a new liquid crystal phase, the so-called mesophase. A fluid phase is the dominant requirement for production of graphitizable carbons.

Non-graphitizing carbons generally do not pass through a fluid stage during carbonization. Since the time of Rosalind Franklin, researchers have put forward a number of models for their structure . Oberlin and colleagues emphasised the role of basic structural units (BSU), made of planar aromatic structures consisting of less than 10-20 rings, with four layers or fewer. Cross-linking between the BSUs in non-graphitizing carbons prevents graphitization. More recently, some have put forward models that incorporate pentagons and other non-six-membered carbon rings.

See also
Acheson process
Carbonization
Graphite

References 

Allotropes of carbon